is a Japanese slalom canoeist who has competed since 2008.

He finished 12th in the C2 event at the 2016 Summer Olympics in Rio de Janeiro together with Tsubasa Sasaki.

References

1993 births
Living people
Japanese male canoeists
Olympic canoeists of Japan
Canoeists at the 2016 Summer Olympics
Canoeists at the 2018 Asian Games
Asian Games competitors for Japan